Michael David Harrity (born 5 October 1946) is a former English footballer who played as a full-back.

Career
Harrity began his senior career with Rotherham United, making 36 Football League appearances for the club scoring five times over the course of three years. In 1968, Harrity signed for Fourth Division club Doncaster Rovers, making two league appearances. Following his spell at Doncaster, Harrity signed for Chelmsford City.

References

1946 births
Living people
Association football defenders
English footballers
Footballers from Sheffield
Rotherham United F.C. players
Doncaster Rovers F.C. players
Chelmsford City F.C. players
English Football League players